Clive Ross (born 14 June 1989) is a former Irish rugby union player who was educated at Midleton College and played for Ulster as a flanker until 2020.

Ulster
Ross joined Ulster in Summer 2014 after playing for two seasons at Lansdowne where he won the All-Ireland League. He made his Ulster debut in the 13–6 loss away to Zebre, on 27 September 2014. He is the cousin of Irish international Mike Ross.

References

1989 births
Irish rugby union players
Ulster Rugby players
Living people
Sportspeople from Cork (city)
Rugby union flankers
People educated at Midleton College
Rugby union players from Cork (city)